Journade (France) or Giornea (Italy) is a sideless overgown or tabard. It was usually pleated and was worn hanging loose or belted.  Young men wore them short and older men wore them calf- or ankle-length.

The Complete Costume Dictionary by Elizabeth J. Lewandowski describes the journade as a "short, circular garment worn for riding. Initially it had large, full sleeves and later it had long, slit sleeves."

See also
1400–1500 in European fashion
1500–50 in Western European fashion

References

Gowns